Jojo, JoJo or Jo Jo is a given name, surname, nickname or stage name used by several people and fictional characters, including:

People with the given name, nickname or stage name

Musicians
JoJo (singer) (born 1990), American R&B singer, songwriter and actress Joanna Levesque
Jojo (Bengali singer), Bengali singer
Miss Jojo, Rwandan R&B singer Josiane Uwineza (born 1983)
JoJo Billingsley (1952–2010), American singer, soloist and songwriter
Jojo Garza, American musician, member of Los Lonely Boys
JoJo Hailey (born 1971), American R&B singer Joel Hailey, half of K-Ci & JoJo and Jodeci
John Hermann, American musician, keyboardist for Widespread Panic
Joseph Hoo Kim (born 1942), Jamaican reggae record producer
Jo Jo Laine (1953–2006), American singer, model, actress, and rock groupie
Jojo Mason (born 1990), Canadian musician
Jojo Mayer (born 1963), Swiss drummer
Jonathan Richman (born 1951), American proto-punk singer-songwriter
Joseph Simmons (born 1964), stage name Rev. Run or DJ Run, a founding member of the hip hop group Run–D.M.C.
JoJo Siwa (born 2003), American dancer, singer and actress

Sports people
Jojó (born 1970), Mozambican retired footballer
JoJo Dickson (born 1989), player in the Canadian Football League
JoJo Domann (born 1997), American football player
Jojo Duncil (born 1983), Philippine Basketball Association player
Jo Jo English (born 1970), American former National Basketball Association player, top scorer in the 1999-2000 Israel Basketball Premier League.
Jojo Lastimosa (born 1964), former Philippine Basketball Association player
Jo-Jo Moore (1908–2001), American Major League Baseball player
JoJo Offerman (born 1994), American professional wrestler, singer. and actress
Jojo Ogunnupe (born 1992), Nigerian footballer
JoJo Polk (born 1978), American former Arena Football League player
Jo-Jo Reyes (born 1984), American Major League Baseball pitcher
JoJo Romero (born 1996), American Major League Baseball pitcher
JoJo Starbuck (born 1951), American figure skater
Jojo Tangkay (born 1976), Philippine basketball player
Jo-Jo Townsell (born 1960), American National Football League player, member of the Hall of Fame
Jo Jo White (1946–2018), American retired National Basketball Association player
Jo-Jo White (1909–1986), American retired Major League Baseball player
Jonatan Christie (born 1997), Indonesian badminton player
Jo Jo Pascua (born 1965), Filipino professional boxer

Other people
Jo-Jo The Dog-Faced Boy, Fedor Jeftichew, Russian–American sideshow performer of the late 1800s
Jawed Ahmad (1986–2009), Afghan reporter imprisoned by the American military in 2007, then released without explanation in 2008
Jejomar Binay (born 1942), Philippine Vice-President and former mayor of Makati
Jojo Chintoh (born c. 1944), Canadian television journalist
JoJo Fletcher (born 1990), American reality TV star on The Bachelorette Season 12
Jo Frost (born 1971), British nanny and TV personality of Supernanny fame, who addresses herself to children as "Jo-Jo"
Jojo Lapus (1945–2006), Filipino show business columnist and screenwriter
Jojo Moyes (born 1969), British romance novelist and journalist
Paquito Ochoa, Jr. (born 1960), Filipino politician and lawyer
JoJo Savard, Canadian self-proclaimed psychic
JoJo Wright, American radio host
Jojo Rabbit, a 2019 American satirical comedy-drama film

People with the surname
Hideo Jojo (born 1975), Japanese film director and screenwriter
Jōjō Masashige (1545–1643), Japanese samurai
Shinji Jojo (born 1977), Japanese retired footballer

Fictional characters with the name
 Joey Jo-Jo Junior Shabadoo, a minor character from The Simpsons animated sitcom ("The Last Temptation of Homer" episode)
 Jojo, a protagonist in the musical Seussical, as well as the book Horton Hears a Who!, on which the musical was partly based
 Jo Jo Dancer, the title character, played by Richard Pryor, in the film Jo Jo Dancer, Your Life Is Calling
 JoJo Tickle, main character of JoJo's Circus, an American children's television show 
 John Joseph "Jo Jo" McCann, main character of Looking After Jo Jo, a 1998 BBC Scotland television series
 Jojo Harte, on the Irish television series Raw (2008–2013)
Mojo Jojo, a simian character in the American animated television show The Powerpuff Girls
 Every protagonist in the Japanese manga series JoJo's Bizarre Adventure
Jonathan Joestar, the protagonist of Phantom Blood
Joseph Joestar, the protagonist of Battle Tendency
Jotaro Kujo, the protagonist of Stardust Crusaders
Giorno Giovanna, the protagonist of Golden Wind (sometimes stylized as GioGio)
Jolyne Cujoh, the protagonist of Stone Ocean
Johnny Joestar, the protagonist of Steel Ball Run
Josuke 'Gappy' Higashikata, the protagonist of JoJolion (named after the previous protagonist of Diamond is Unbreakable)
Jodio Joestar, the protagonist of The JOJOLands
Jojo Khalastra, on The Comedy Store Israeli television show
 Jojo, in the Beatles song "Get Back"
 Jojo the Kissing Bandit, in the Avatar: The Last Airbender trading card game
 Granny Jojo Watterson, a pink rabbit character in the American animated television show The Amazing World of Gumball
 Jojo, main character of the Belgian comic series Jojo created by André Geerts
 Johannes "Jojo" Betzler, the young protagonist of Jojo Rabbit, a comedy-drama film
 JoJo, one of the titular characters in British TV series JoJo & Gran Gran
 Jojo, one of the students in animated TV series Ollie's Pack
 Jojo, daughter of Rachel, and the niece of Maddie and Tom Wachowski from Sonic the Hedgehog film series.

Lists of people by nickname
Unisex given names